Poynton's caco or Poynton's dainty frog (Cacosternum poyntoni) is a species of frog in the family Pyxicephalidae, endemic to South Africa.

References

Cacosternum
Endemic amphibians of South Africa
Taxonomy articles created by Polbot